"A Song to Mama" is a song written by June Carter Cash, Helen Carter and George Jones and originally recorded by The Carter Family, with the uncredited participation of Johnny Cash.

The song is a tribute to Maybelle Carter.

Released in July 1971 as a single (Columbia 4-45758, with "One More Summer in Virginia" on the opposite side), the song reached number 37 on U.S. Billboard country chart for the week of October 9.

The song was later included as the opening track on The Carter Family album Travelin' Minstrel Band (1972).

Track listing

Charts

References

External links 
 "A Song to Mama" on the Johnny Cash official website

Carter Family songs
Johnny Cash songs
Songs written by June Carter Cash
Songs written by Helen Carter
Songs written by George Jones
Song recordings produced by Billy Sherrill
1971 songs
1971 singles
Columbia Records singles